Philibert Jones (born 12 November 1964) is a former international footballer from Trinidad and Tobago who played as a striker. He is currently the Assistant Coach at United Petrotrin in the TT Pro League.

Career
Amongst his professional clubs was the Charlotte Eagles in the United States, where he scored 18 goals in the 1996 season. Jones also played for United Petrotrin in Trinidad.

Jones also played at international level, and participated at a number of tournaments including the 1989 Caribbean Championship, and the 1991 CONCACAF Gold Cup. He also appeared in FIFA World Cup qualifying matches.

Personal life
His nephew is current player Kenwyne Jones.

References

1964 births
Living people
Trinidad and Tobago footballers
Trinidad and Tobago expatriate footballers
Trinidad and Tobago international footballers
1991 CONCACAF Gold Cup players
United Petrotrin F.C. players
Charlotte Eagles players
USISL players
USL Second Division players
Expatriate soccer players in the United States
Trinidad and Tobago expatriate sportspeople in the United States
Association football forwards